Hatchard is a surname. Notable people with the surname include: 

Anne Hatchard (born 1998), Australian football player
Caroline Hatchard (1883–1970), British soprano, musical theatre and opera singer
Danny Hatchard (born 1991), English actor
Jack Hatchard (1917–1984), New Zealand football player
John Hatchard (1769–1849), English publisher and bookseller
Thomas Hatchard (1818–1870), English bishop of Mauritius